Babak Taghvaee is an Iranian military aviation journalist and author living in exile.

Studies
Babak Taghvaee studied at two universities in Iran in 2011.

Journalism in Iran
Babak Taghvaee became a journalist writing about Iranian aviation history in 2005 as a freelancer, writing in Persian. In 2008 he became a correspondent for Iran Aviation Industries Magazine and published English-language article on the Iranian Army Day  parade in British aviation magazines, including AirForces Monthly and Combat Aircraft, and in German military aviation magazines.

Taghvaee became a photojournalist and was contracted by the defence company Tose'e Fannavaran-e Havapayeh to advise air force technical staff on restoring Iranian Air Force fighter jets. The Chief Executive Officer of the company, Ataollah Bazargan, who was strongly pro-government, was, according to Taghvaee, upset about Taghvaee's documentation of pre-Iranian Revolution (pre-1979) military history and fraud by the company itself, and at Taghvaee's 2011 official appointment with co-responsibility for the Historical Identity of IRIAF project aimed at documenting Iranian air force history.

Persecution
In April 2012, Bazargan had Taghvaee fired from Tose'e Fannavaran-e Havapayeh and reported as a spy. Taghvaee was arrested after photographing some helicopters. He was detained in several prisons, including Evin Prison in Tehran, and accused of being a spy for MI6, Mossad, and the CIA. Taghvaee made false confessions of illegal actions in attempts to obtain bail, failing several times.

While imprisoned, Taghvaee was threatened with torture and heard other prisoners screaming in pain from torture, but was not tortured himself.

Journalism in exile
, he expected to be sentenced to death if he returned to Iran. He suffered from post-traumatic stress disorder and paranoia following his escape, worrying that he would be assassinated. While in Malaysia, Taghvaee typically was protected by twelve bodyguards.

From 2013 to 2021, Taghvaee wrote about 200 articles and news reports and three books about military aviation, the Russian and Ukrainian Air Forces, the war in Donbas, and the air war in the international military intervention against ISIL. In 2021, he claimed that the Pakistan Air Force used Chinese CH-4 drones in the Panjshir conflict in Afghanistan.

Personal views
Taghvaee's summary statement in an interview with Concrete was:

References

Living people
Iranian journalists
Year of birth missing (living people)